The 2015 Delta State gubernatorial election was the 7th gubernatorial election of Delta State. Held on April 11, 2015, the People's Democratic Party nominee Ifeanyi Okowa won the election, defeating Great Ogboru of the LP.

PDP primary
PDP candidate and a Senator, Ifeanyi Okowa defeated 17 other contestants to clinch the party ticket. He won with 406 votes to defeat his closest rival, Olorogun David Edevbie, who received 299 votes. Victor Ochei, former Speaker of Delta State House of Assembly received 185 votes, Ndudi Elumelu received 50 votes, Godsday Orubebe received 49 votes. Godswill Obielum received 22 votes. Sylvester Monye, Ovie Omo-Agege, Ngozi Olejeme and Sam Obi received 10 votes each. Peter Okocha received 6 votes. Festus Okobor received 5 votes. Tony Obuh received 5 votes. Charles Emetulu received 4 votes. Gabriel Oyibode and Johnson Opone both received 3 votes each. Kenneth Gbagi received 2 votes. Mike Uwaka received 1 vote. The Deputy Governor of the state, Amos Utuamah withdrew from the primary. 1,121 delegates was accredited. Amos Utuamah After the election, the outgoing Governor of the State Emmanuel Uduaghan urged the losers in the primaries to support the winner, Ifeanyi Okowa in the interest of the party.

Candidates
Ifeanyi Okowa
Olorogun David Edevbie
Victor Ochei
Ndudi Elumelu
Godsday Orubebe
Godswill Obielum
Sylvester Monye
Ovie Omo-Agege
Ngozi Olejeme
Sam Obi
Festus Okobor
Peter Okocha
Tony Obuh
Charles Emetulu
Johnson Opone
Gabriel Oyibode
Kenneth Gbagi
Mike Uwaka

LP primary
Twenty three governorship aspirants picked form to contest under the LP. Eight aspirants returned their forms, three aspirants were disqualified and only five aspirants contested in the primaries. Four of the contestants later withdrew and adopted Great Ogboru as their consensus candidate.

Candidates
Great Ogboru

Other governorship aspirant and party
Otega Emerhor, APC
Atagbuzia Sixtus Chibueze, KP
Idawene Oke Hezx, SDP
Ibordor Irikefe Emmanuel, APGA
Anthony Prest, UPN
Joe Chukwu, ADC
Ashikodi David, A
Efemona Success Oraka, PDM
Agbeyegbe Mathew Majemite Bob, ID
Elloh Awele Oyinsi,	MPPP
Peters Emuakpoje-Erho, CPP
Philips George Onnyemachi, UPP
Okiogbero Jonathan Edhebru, NCP
Onwubuya John Abraham, ACD
Jane Oluremi-Bats One-Mohammed, PDC
Paul Ala Isamadem, ACPN

Results 
A total of 18 candidates contested in the election. Ifeanyi Okowa from the PDP won the election, defeating Great Ogboru from the LP.

Aftermath
After the election, Otega Emerhor from the All Progressives Congress challenged the outcome of the election at the Delta State Governorship Elections Petitions Tribunal. The APC candidate told the tribunal to cancel the elections and order a fresh one. The tribunal dismissed the petition and upheld the election of Ifeanyi Okowa. Great Ogboru from the LP also challenged the outcome of the election at the Delta State Governorship Elections Petitions Tribunal. The LP candidate with his petition marked EPT/DT/GOV/01/2019, told the tribunal that the winner and his party, the PDP were unduly credited with excess votes by the Independent National Electoral Commission and that there was multiple voting as well as voting without smart card reader accreditation. The tribunal dismissed the petition for failing to prove the allegations of voting without accreditation, illegal allocation of unlawful votes and multiple voting. The both cases by the APC and LP candidates was taken to the Appeal court. Delivering the judgement, the Appeal court affirmed the election of the PDP candidate, Ifeanyi Okowa and dismissed the appeal of the LP candidate for lacking in merit. The Appeal court also dismissed the appeal by the candidate of the APC and upheld the judgement of the tribunal. The both cases was also taken to Supreme court. On the judgement day, the Supreme court dismissed both petitions and said it's as an abuse of court process.

References 

Delta State gubernatorial elections
Delta gubernatorial
April 2015 events in Nigeria